Kent Invicta is a defunct rugby league team that were based in Maidstone, Kent and later Southend in Essex.

History

Kent Invicta RLFC and Southend Invicta RLFC
Kent Invicta RLFC was formed by a local businessman, Paul Faires, and Jim Thompson, Maidstone United FC's chairman. The club was admitted to the Rugby Football League on 6 April 1983 and entered the Second Division. The moniker "Invicta" (unvanquished) is the motto of Kent. The club colours consisted of a black shirt with an amber chevron, black shorts and black socks. The club played its first game at London Road, Maidstone, a ground it shared with Maidstone United. It lost the game 31-12 against Cardiff City Blue Dragons. By 6 November 1983 the club was bankrupt. Despite its financial problems, the club continued playing competitively.

In late 1984 the team became Southend Invicta, and started playing games at the Roots Hall Stadium in Southend. The club colours changed to white shirts with a blue V, white shorts and white socks. Invicta were struck from the 1985-86 fixtures by the Rugby Football League because it was considered not to have formed a team. It went into liquidation soon afterwards.

Notable players
John Donnelly
Mark Elia
Gary Freeman
Gary Hetherington
Lynn Hopkins
Bob Mordell

External links
 Kent/Southern Invicta social media website

Rugby league teams in Kent
Defunct rugby league teams in England
Rugby league teams in Essex
Sports clubs in Southend-on-Sea
English rugby league teams
Rugby clubs established in 1983
1983 establishments in England
1986 disestablishments in England